Ismaël Camara (born 11 November 2000) is a Guinean professional footballer who plays as a forward for Championnat National 2 club Épinal.

Career
Camara came through the youth ranks of Angoulême, securing a move to Red Star in 2017. He made his first team debut for the club as a stoppage time substitute in the Championnat National game against Cholet on 11 August 2017. He scored his first league goal for the club on 26 April 2019, in the Ligue 2 game against Metz.

In October 2019, Camara was hospitalised after contracting Malaria whilst with the Guinea under-23 squad. He was initially put into an induced coma, but was released from hospital later the same month. His team-mates paid homage to him before their match against Avranches on 4 October, and dedicated the win to him.

Personal life
Camara was born in Guinea, and moved to France at the age of 9.

References

External links
 

2000 births
Living people
Guinean footballers
Association football forwards
French footballers
Guinean emigrants to France
French sportspeople of Guinean descent
Angoulême Charente FC players
Red Star F.C. players
Gazélec Ajaccio players

Championnat National players
Ligue 2 players
Championnat National 2 players
Black French sportspeople